The 2018 Brisbane Lions season is the ' 22nd season in the AFL. It is also their 2nd season in the AFL Women's and they will field a reserves team in the NEAFL.

AFL

List changes

At the end of the 2017 season, the Lions announced that they were delisting five players from their squad: Ryan Harwood, Jarrad Jansen, Josh Clayton, Jonathan Freeman and Blake Grewar. They had all played in the Lions' 2017 NEAFL Grand Final win. They received a draft pick at the end of the first round (pick 18) as compensation.

On the last day of the 2017 trade period, Brisbane made three trades. Four-time premiership player and former captain of  Luke Hodge decided to come out of retirement and was traded to the Lions. Queenslander Charlie Cameron also requested a trade to the club and the Lions gave up pick 12 to secure him. Young key forward Josh Schache, who Brisbane had drafted with pick 2 in the 2015 national draft, requested a trade back to Victoria.

Retirements and delistings

Trades

Free agency

Out

Squad

Ladder

Season summary

AFLX Competition

Pre-season

Home and Away season

Round 1

Round 2

Round 3

Round 4

Round 5

Round 6

Round 7

Round 8

Round 9

Round 10

Round 11

Round 12

Round 13

Round 14

Round 15

Round 16

Round 17

Round 18

Round 19

Round 20

Round 21

Round 22

Round 23

Milestones

Awards & nominations

AFL

Nominations

2018 Brownlow Medal

References

External links
 Official website of the Brisbane Lions Football Club
 The Brisbane Lions – an Overview – Official AFL website of the Brisbane Lions Football Club

Brisbane Lions seasons
2018 Australian Football League season